There are over 200 species within the land snail genus Amphidromus.

These species used to be divided into three subgenera:, They are all accepted as an alternate representation
 subgenus Amphidromus Albers, 1850
 subgenus Goniodromus Bülow, 1905
 subgenus Syndromus Pilsbry, 1900

Subgenus Amphidromus 
subgenus Amphidromus Albers, 1850
 Amphidromus abbasi Chan & Tan, 2010
 Amphidromus abbasorum Thach, 2017
 Amphidromus abbotthuberorum Thach, 2017
 Amphidromus agnieszkae Thach, 2020
 Amphidromus alfi Thach, 2020
 Amphidromus alicetandiasae J. Parsons, 2016
 Amphidromus alicjaboronae Thach, 2021
 Amphidromus alticola Fulton, 1896
 Amphidromus ameliae Dharma, 2007
 Amphidromus andamanicus (Hanley & Theobald, 1876)
 Amphidromus anhdaoorum
 Amphidromus anhduongae Thach, 2020
 Amphidromus anthonyabbotti Thach & F. Huber, 2017
 Amphidromus atricallosus (Gould, 1843)
  Amphidromus atricallosus classiarius Sutcharit & Panha, 2006
 Amphidromus atricallosus leucoxanthus (von Martens, 1864)
 Amphidromus atricallosus perakensis Fulton, 1901
 Amphidromus backeljaui Thach, 2020
 Amphidromus baili Thach, 2020
 Amphidromus baoi Thach, 2017
 Amphidromus bernardfamyi Thach, 2017
 Amphidromus berschaueri Thach, 2018 (taxon inquirendum, debated synonym)
 Amphidromus berschaueri mingi Thach, 2019
 Amphidromus binhphuocensis Thach, 2019
 Amphidromus boroni Thach, 2020
 Amphidromus bozhii Y.C. Wang, 2019
 Amphidromus bramvanderbijli Thach, 2019
 Amphidromus buelowi Fruhstorfer, 1905
 Amphidromus buluanensis Bartsch, 1917
 Amphidromus calista Pilsbry, 1900
 Amphidromus cambojiensis (Reeve, 1860)
 Amphidromus capistratus E. von Martens, 1903
 Amphidromus centrocelebensis Bollinger, 1918
 Amphidromus cochinchinensis (L. Pfeiffer, 1857)
 Amphidromus coeruleus Clench & Archer, 1932
 Amphidromus cognatus Fulton, 1907
 Amphidromus columellaris Möllendorff, 1892
 Amphidromus comes (L. Pfeiffer, 1861)
 Amphidromus consobrinus Fulton, 1897
 Amphidromus contrarius (O. F. Müller, 1774)
 Amphidromus cossignanii Thach, 2021
 Amphidromus costiferE. A. Smith, 1893 
 Amphidromus cruentatus
 Amphidromus dancei Dharma, 2021
 Amphidromus davidberschaueri Thach, 2021
 Amphidromus dekkeri Thach, 2021
 Amphidromus delsaerdti Thach, 2016
 Amphidromus djajasasmitai Dharma, 1993
 Amphidromus dohrni (L. Pfeiffer, 1864)
 Amphidromus donchani Thach, 2019
 Amphidromus duboismercesylviae Thach & F. Huber, 2020
 Amphidromus dungae Thach, 2021
 Amphidromus eichhorsti Thach, 2020
 Amphidromus elviae Dharma, 2007
 Amphidromus elvinae Dharma, 2007
 Amphidromus enganoensis Fulton, 1896
 Amphidromus entobaptus Dohrn, 1889
 Amphidromus epidemiae Y.-C. Wang, 2021
 Amphidromus escondidus Poppe, 2020
 Amphidromus feliciae Thach & Abbas, 2020
 Amphidromus felixi Dharma, 2021
 Amphidromus fengae Y.C. Wang, 2019
 Amphidromus frednaggsi Thach & F. Huber, 2018
 Amphidromus friedahuberae Thach & F. Huber, 2017
 Amphidromus gattingeri Thach & F. Huber, 2020
 Amphidromus gisellelieae Thach & Abbas, 2022
 Amphidromus givenchyi Geret, 1912
 Amphidromus glaucolarynx (Dohrn, 1861)
 Amphidromus globonevilli Sutcharit & Panha, 2015
 Amphidromus grohi Thach, 2021
 Amphidromus gustafi Thach & F. Huber, 2020
 Amphidromus harryleei Thach, 2020
 Amphidromus haszprunari Thach, 2020
 Amphidromus hejingi Thach, 2019
 Amphidromus herosae Thach, 2021
 Amphidromus hongdaoae Thach, 2017
 Amphidromus huanganhi Thach, 2020
 Amphidromus huynhanhi Thach, 2019
 Amphidromus huynhi Thach, 2019
 Amphidromus inversus (Müller, 1774)
 Amphidromus inversus albulus Sutcharit & Panha, 2006
 Amphidromus inversus annamiticus (Crosse & Fischer, 1863)
 Amphidromus inversus inversus Müller, 1774
 Amphidromus jacobsoni Laidlaw, 1954
 Amphidromus javanicus Amphidromus jadeni Thach, 2021
 Amphidromus janus (L. Pfeiffer, 1854)
 Amphidromus javanicus (G. B. Sowerby I, 1833)
 Amphidromus jeffabbasorum Thach, 2016
 Amphidromus johnstanisici Thach & Huber, 2017
 Amphidromus jomi Dumrongrojwattana, Wongkamhaeng & Tanamai, 2019
 Amphidromus jonabletti Thach, 2019
 Amphidromus juliekeppensae Thach, 2021
 Amphidromus kalaoensis Fulton, 1896
 Amphidromus kantori Thach & F. Huber, 2020
 Amphidromus keppensdhondtorum Thach, 2018
 Amphidromus khammouanensis Thach & F. Huber, 2017
 Amphidromus khoatuanorum Thach, 2021
 Amphidromus kiati Thach, 2020
 Amphidromus koenigi Thach & F. Huber, 2018
 Amphidromus kiati Thach, 2020
 Amphidromus koonpoi Amphidromus laii Thach, 2019
 Amphidromus laosianus Bavay, 1898
 Amphidromus latestrigatus M.M. Schepman, 1892
 Amphidromus ledaoae Thach, 2016
 Amphidromus leeanus Thach, 2021
 Amphidromus leucoxanthus (E. von Martens, 1864)
 Amphidromus liei Thach, 2017
 Amphidromus liei joshuathami Thach, 2018
 Amphidromus lilianaboronae Thach, 2021
 Amphidromus loanphungae Thach, 2020
 Amphidromus lucsegersi Thach & Abbas, 2017
 Amphidromus madelineae Thach, 2020
 Amphidromus marekboroni Thach, 2021
 Amphidromus mariaeThach & F. Huber, 2017 
 Amphidromus mariasendersae Thach & F. Huber, 2017
 Amphidromus marki Thach, 2021
 Amphidromus markpankowskii Thach, 2020
 Amphidromus martensi Boettger, 1894
 Amphidromus maryae Thach, 2021
 Amphidromus masoni (Godwin-Austen, 1876)
 Amphidromus maxi Thach, 2020
 Amphidromus michaeli Thach, 2021
 Amphidromus mingmini Thach, 2019
 Amphidromus minhthaoae Thach, 2020
 Amphidromus mirandus Bavay & Dautzenberg, 1912
 Amphidromus monsecourorum Thach & F. Huber, 2017
 Amphidromus ngai Thach, 2019
 Amphidromus nganguyeni Thach, 2021
 Amphidromus ngocae Thach, 2021
 Amphidromus ngocanhi Thach, 2017
 Amphidromus nguyenkhoai Thach, 2020
 Amphidromus nguyetminhae Thach, 2020
 Amphidromus niasensis Fulton, 1907
 Amphidromus nicoasiarum Thach, 2021
 Amphidromus nicoi Thach, 2017
 Amphidromus noriokowasoei Thach & F. Huber, 2017
 Amphidromus palaceus (Mousson, 1848)
 Amphidromus pankowskiae Thach, 2020
 Amphidromus pankowskianus Thach, 2020
 Amphidromus pankowskiorum Thach, 2021
 Amphidromus patbaili Thach & F. Huber, 2021
 Amphidromus pattinsonae Iredale, 1943
 Amphidromus perrieri A. de Rochebrune, 1882 
 Amphidromus persimilis J. Parsons, 2019
 Amphidromus pervariabilis Bavay & Dautzenberg, 1909
 Amphidromus perversus (Linnaeus, 1758) - the type species of the genus Amphidromus Amphidromus perversus butoti Amphidromus perversus emaciatus Amphidromus perversus natunensis Fulton, 1896
 Amphidromus petestimpsoni Thach, 2021
 Amphidromus phamanhi Thach, 2016
 Amphidromus phamanhorum Thach, 2021
 Amphidromus phamtuanhae Thach, 2021
 Amphidromus phamvutuanhae Thach, 2022
 Amphidromus philippeboucheti Thach, 2019
 Amphidromus poppei Thach, 2020
 Amphidromus protania Lehmann & Maassen, 2004
 Amphidromus qiongensis J. He & Q.-H. Zhou, 2017
 * Amphidromus reflexilabris Schepman, 1892
 Amphidromus quangtrungi Thach, 2021
 Amphidromus reflexilabris Schepman, 1892
 Amphidromus reuselaarsi Thach, 2018
 Amphidromus roseolabiatus Fulton, 1896
 Amphidromus schomburgki (Pfeiffer, 1860)
 Amphidromus schomburgki dextrochlorus Sutcharit & Panha, 2006
 Amphidromus sandersae Thach & F. Huber, 2020
 Amphidromus sekincauensis Amphidromus similis Pilsbry, 1900
 Amphidromus simonei Thach, 2020
 Amphidromus siongkiati Thach, 2019
 Amphidromus sowyani Thach, 2019
 Amphidromus sriabbasae Thach, 2017
 Amphidromus stanyi Dharma, 2021
 Amphidromus stevenabbasorum Thach, 2021
 Amphidromus sylviae Stark, 2017
 Amphidromus syndromoideus Inkhavilay & Panha, 2017
 Amphidromus szekeresi Thach, 2020
 Amphidromus thachi Amphidromus thachorum F. Huber, 2020
 Amphidromus thaitieni Thach & F. Huber, 2020
 Amphidromus thomasi Thach, 2021
 Amphidromus thuthaoae Thach, 2021
 Amphidromus timorensis Parsons & Abbas, 2020
 Amphidromus trianensis Thach & F. Huber, 2018
 Amphidromus truongi Thach, 2021
 Amphidromus tuanhae Thach, 2021
 Amphidromus tuani Thach, 2021
 Amphidromus tureki Thach, 2021
 † Amphidromus ubaldii Dharma, 2021 
 Amphidromus yauyeejiae Thach & Abbas, 2017
 Amphidromus verbinneni Segers, 2020
 Amphidromus vincekessneri Thach, 2020
 Amphidromus walleri Thach, 2020
 Amphidromus yauyeejiae Thach & Abbas, 2017
 Amphidromus zebrinus (L. Pfeiffer, 1861)
 Amphidromus zelosus Y.-C. Wang & Z.-Y. Chen, 2021

 Subgenus Syndromus 
subgenus Syndromus Pilsbry, 1900

All species of the subgenus Syndromus are sinistral with two exceptions: amphidromine Amphidromus glaucolarynx and dextral Amphidromus kruehni.
 Amphidromus adamsii (Reeve, 1848)
 Amphidromus adamsii articulata Fulton, 1896
 Amphidromus adamsii duplocincta Fulton, 1896
 Amphidromus adamsii inornata Fulton, 1896
 Amphidromus adamsii luteofasciata Fulton, 1896
 Amphidromus adamsii ornata Fulton, 1896
 Amphidromus adamsii rubiginosa Fulton, 1896
 Amphidromus adamsii rufocincta Fulton, 1896
 Amphidromus adamsii simplex Fulton, 1896
 Amphidromus adamsii subunicolor Fulton, 1896
 Amphidromus adamsii superba Fulton, 1896
 Amphidromus alicetandiasae Parsons, 2016
 Amphidromus areolatus (Pfeiffer, 1861)
 Amphidromus coeruleus Clench & Archer, 1932
 Amphidromus contrarius (Müller, 1774) - the type species of the subgenus Syndromus Amphidromus contrarius maculata Fulton, 1896
 Amphidromus contrarius multifasciata Fulton, 1896
 Amphidromus contrarius rolfei Thach, 2018
 Amphidromus flavus (Pfeiffer, 1861)
 Amphidromus flavus proxima Fulton, 1896
 Amphidromus fuscolabris Möllendorff, 1898
 Amphidromus floresianus Fulton, 1897
 Amphidromus glaucolarynx (Dohrn, 1861) - This is the only one amphidromine (left-handed and right-handed snails occur in the population) species in the subgenus Syndromus.
 Amphidromus globonevilli Sutcharit & Panha, 2015
 Amphidromus haematostoma Möllendorff, 1898
 Amphidromus iunior Cilia, 2013
 Amphidromus kruehni - This is the only dextral species in the subgenus Syndromus.
 Amphidromus laevus (Müller, 1774)
 Amphidromus laevus romaensis Rolle, 1903
 Amphidromus pictus Fulton, 1896
 Amphidromus poecilochrous Fulton, 1896 / Amphidromus poecilochroa Fulton, 1896
 Amphidromus porcellanus (Mousson, 1848)
 Amphidromus principalis Sutcharit & Panha, 2015
 Amphidromus richardi Severns, 2006
 Amphidromus richardi manacocoensis Severns, 2006
 Amphidromus roemeri (Pfeiffer, 1863)
 Amphidromus rottiensis Chan & Tan, 2010
 Amphidromus semitessellatus (Morlet, 1884)
 Amphidromus stevenliei Parsons, 2016Amphidromus sumatranus (Martens, 1864)
 Amphidromus xiengensis Morlet, 1891
 Amphidromus xiengkhaungensis Inkhavilay & Panha, 2017
 Amphidromus sp. - an undescribed species from Lampung, Indonesia

 Subgenus Goniodromus 
 Amphidromus buelowi Fruhstorfer, 1905
 Amphidromus buelowi malalakensis Parsons & Abbas, 2016

subgenus Incertae sedis Amphidromus cognatus Fulton, 1907

subgenus ?
 Amphidromus alticola Fulton, 1896
 Amphidromus andamanicus Amphidromus andamanicus nicobarica Godwin-Austen, 1895
 Amphidromus angulatus Fulton, 1896
 Amphidromus annamiticus Amphidromus annamiticus roseotincta Möllendorff, 1894
 Amphidromus asper Haas, 1934
 Amphidromus aureocincta Fulton, 1896
 Amphidromus banksi Butot, 1955
 Amphidromus baolocensis Thach & F. Huber, 2016
 Amphidromus bataviae (Grateloup, 1840)
 Amphidromus begini (Morlet, 1886)Amphidromus cambojiensis (Reeve, 1860)
 Amphidromus candidus Amphidromus chloris Reeve, 1848
 Amphidromus cochinchinensis (Pfeiffer, 1857)
 Amphidromus columellaris Amphidromus columellaris gloriosa Fulton, 1896
 Amphidromus comes (Pfeiffer, 1861)
 Amphidromus concinna Fulton, 1896
 Amphidromus consobrinus Fulton, 1897
 Amphidromus contusus (Reeve, 1848)
 Amphidromus costifer Smith, 1893
 Amphidromus crassa Fulton, 1899
 Amphidromus cruentatus (Morelet, 1875)
 Amphidromus dambriensis Thach & F. Huber, 2016
 Amphidromus daoae Thach, 2016
 Amphidromus dautzenbergi Fulton, 1899
 Amphidromus delsaerdti Thach, 2016
 Amphidromus djajasasmitai Amphidromus dohrni (Pfeiffer, 1864)
 Amphidromus dubius Fulton, 1896
 Amphidromus enganoensis Fulton, 1896
 Amphidromus entobaptus Amphidromus eques (Pfeiffer, 1857)
 Amphidromus everetti Fulton, 1896
 Amphidromus everetti connectens Fulton, 1896
 Amphidromus filozonatus Amphidromus filozonatus jucunda Fulton, 1896
 Amphidromus friedae Thach & F. Huber, 2016
 Amphidromus hamatus Fulton, 1896
 Amphidromus heerianus Amphidromus heerianus poecillus Amphidromus heinrichhuberi Thach & F. Huber, 2016
 Amphidromus hongdaoae Thach, 2017
 Amphidromus hosei Smith, 1895
 Amphidromus hueae Thach & F. Huber, 2016
 Amphidromus inconstans Fulton, 1898
 Amphidromus janus (Pfeiffer, 1854)
 Amphidromus kalaoensis Fulton, 1896
 Amphidromus kruijti Amphidromus lepidus (Gould, 1856)
 Amphidromus lindstedti (Pfeiffer, 1857)
 Amphidromus loricatus (Pfeiffer, 1855)
 Amphidromus lamdongensis Thach & F. Huber, 2016
 Amphidromus ledaoae Thach, 2016
 Amphidromus luangensis Gra-tes, 2015
 Amphidromus maculatus Amphidromus maculiferus Amphidromus maculiferus gracilior Fulton, 1896
 Amphidromus maculiferus inflata Fulton, 1896
 Amphidromus maculiferus obscura Fulton, 1896
 Amphidromus masoni (Godwin-Austen, 1876)
 Amphidromus melanomma (Pfeiffer, 1852)
 Amphidromus metabletus Amphidromus moniliferus (Gould, 1846)
 Amphidromus mouhoti (Pfeiffer, 1861)
 Amphidromus niasensis Fulton, 1907
 Amphidromus niasensis f. sowerbyi Amphidromus perakensis Fulton, 1901
 Amphidromus perakensis globosus Fulton, 1903
 Amphidromus phamanhi Thach, 2016
 Amphidromus placidus Fulton, 1896
 Amphidromus psephos Vermeulen, Liew & Schilthuizen, 2015
 Amphidromus quadrasi Amphidromus quadrasi solida Fulton, 1896
 Amphidromus reflexilabris Amphidromus robustus Fulton, 1896
 Amphidromus schileykoi Thach, 2016
 Amphidromus sinensis (Benson, 1851)
 Amphidromus sinensis gracilis Fulton, 1896
 Amphidromus sinensis vicaria Fulton, 1896
 Amphidromus singalangensis Rolle, 1908
 Amphidromus sinistralis (Reeve, 1849)
 Amphidromus sinistralis lutea Fulton, 1896
 Amphidromus sinistralis rosea Fulton, 1896
 Amphidromus smithii Fulton, 1896 or Amphidromus smithi Fulton, 1896
 Amphidromus sowerbyi Fulton, 1907
 Amphidromus sumbaensis Fulton, 1896
 Amphidromus suspectus Amphidromus suspectus albolabiata Fulton, 1896
 Amphidromus taluensis Gra-tes, 2015
 Amphidromus taluensis borealis Gra-tes, 2015
 Amphidromus thanhhoaensis Thach & F. Huber, 2016
 Amphidromus theobaldianus (Benson, 1857)
 Amphidromus ventrosulus Möllendorff, 1900
 Amphidromus versicolor Fulton, 1896
 Amphidromus webbi Fulton, 1907
 Amphidromus webbi babiensis Laidlaw, 1954
 Amphidromus webbi simalurensis Laidlaw, 1954
 Amphidromus winteri Amphidromus winteri inauris Fulton, 1896
 Amphidromus zebrinus (Pfeiffer, 1861)
Other
 Amphidromus sinensis globosa Nevill, 1878 - nomen nudum

 References 

 Wang Yung Ching, He Ping, Shen Yang (2019), Review on the synonymy concerning genus Amphidromus Albers, 1850 (Gastropoda: Camaenidae), with descriptions of new species''; The Festivus 51 (4), 2019

L